Zoar Moravian Church (The Zoar Church) is a historic church in Laketown Township, Minnesota, United States, near the city of Waconia, Minnesota.  It was built in 1863 by a congregation of immigrants from Hopedale, Pennsylvania.  It is built in a Greek Revival style, typical of other early public buildings in Minnesota.  The steeple was moved forward in 1908 to create a bell tower.  The congregation disbanded in the 1940s, but the church is maintained and used by the Waconia Moravian Church.

The church was added to the National Register of Historic Places in 1980.

See also
 Laketown Moravian Brethren's Church
 National Register of Historic Places listings in Carver County, Minnesota

References

Churches in Carver County, Minnesota
Churches completed in 1863
Churches on the National Register of Historic Places in Minnesota
Greek Revival church buildings in Minnesota
Moravian churches in the United States
Wooden churches in Minnesota
National Register of Historic Places in Carver County, Minnesota
1863 establishments in Minnesota